The 2012 Campeonato Cearense de Futebol was the 98th season of the top professional football league in the state of Ceará, Brazil. The competition began on January 18 and ended on May 13. Ceará won the championship for the 41st time, while Itapipoca, Trairiense and Crateús were relegated.

Format
Each team plays the other once in a round-robin format followed by four team playoff with home-and-away series.

Qualifications
The two teams on the finals will qualify for the 2013 Copa do Brasil and 2013 Copa do Nordeste. The best team not playing in Campeonato Brasileiro Série A, B or C will qualify for 2012 Campeonato Brasileiro Série D.

Teams

First stage

Standings

Results

Final Stage

Semifinals

First leg

Second leg

Finals

Ceará won due to better campaign on First stage.

Top goalscorers

Source Federação Cearense de Futebol
Last updated: 14 May 2012

References

Cearense
Campeonato Cearense